Proton City Highway, Federal Route 258, is a major highway in Perak, Malaysia. The 3.81 km (2.4 mi) federal highway connects Tanjung Malim North Interchange of the Tanjung Malim-Slim River Highway (Federal Route 1) to Proton City in the east. It is a main route to Proton City. The kilometre zero is located at Tanjung Malim North Interchange.

Features
At most sections, the Federal Route 258 was built under the JKR R5 road standard, allowing maximum speed limit of up to 90 km/h.

There are no overlaps, alternate routes, or sections with motorcycle lanes.

List of interchanges

References

Highways in Malaysia
Malaysian Federal Roads